Little Happiness is a 2014 British-Turkish drama film directed by Nihat Seven. It was selected as the British entry for the Best Foreign Language Film at the 87th Academy Awards, but was not nominated.

Cast
 Mehtap Anil as Esma
 Derin Bebek as Ferhat baby 2
 Bora Cengiz as Murat
 Nil Günal as Gulten
 Murat Muslu as Selim / Kemal
 Ahmet Ozarslan as Salih
 Atilla Pekoz as Tekin
 Nejat Sarp as Ferhat baby 1
 Erdogan Tutkun as Accountant
 Erdem Yilmaz as Rifat
 Hakan Yufkacigil as Fariz

See also
 List of submissions to the 87th Academy Awards for Best Foreign Language Film
 List of British submissions for the Academy Award for Best Foreign Language Film

References

External links
 

2014 films
2014 drama films
British drama films
Turkish drama films
2010s Turkish-language films
2010s British films